Blythswood Football Club was a 19th-century football club based in Glasgow.

History

The club was founded on 14 August 1873 as an offshoot of the Blythswood Cricket Club, which had changed its name from the Bellegrove club in 1866, and which played at Queen's Park until 1869.  

Blythswood was one of the clubs taking part in the first Scottish Cup in 1873–74.  Its first entry saw its best run, with two wins taking the club to the semi-final.  In the second round, the club won 2–0 at Alexandra Athletic, although it caused a little controversy by appointing one of the club members as its umpire, who then proceeded to give tactical advice during the match; nevertheless the clubs enjoyed a convivial toast afterwards.

In the semi-final, the club was 4–0 down to Clydesdale after 80 minutes, when the match was stopped because of bad light.  However the score was allowed to stand.

The club continued to enter until 1878–79, albeit without any success, a number of its players having joined the Western club before the 1874–75 season; the club's final entry saw it drawn away to the Clyde club in the first round, but before the tie took place, Blythswood amalgamated with the Derby club.  

A revival of the club in the 1880s was unsuccessful, the last recorded game being a 9–0 defeat to the Hawthorne club in 1882; a game against Glenburn scheduled for the next month does not seem to have taken place.

Ground

The club played at Westburn Park (also known as Burnbank), in Kelvinside.

Colours

The club's colours were red and black 1 inch "stripes", which in the 1870s referred to hoops.

External links
 Scottish Football Club Directory
Scottish Cup fixtures

References

Defunct football clubs in Scotland
Football clubs in Glasgow
Association football clubs established in 1873
Association football clubs disestablished in 1879
1873 establishments in Scotland
1879 disestablishments in Scotland

re